Wilson Iván Carabalí Gonzales (born August 11, 1972 in Guayaquil, Ecuador) is a former Ecuadorian footballer who played for clubs of Ecuador.

Personal life
Wilson Carabalí is the father of the also Ecuadorian footballers Omar Carabalí and Wilson Carabalí Jr., who serve on the lower of Colo-Colo of Chile.

Titles
 Emelec 2001 and 2002 (Ecuadorian Primera División Championship)

References

External links
 
 Wilson Carabalí at playmakerstats.com (English version of ceroacero.es)
 

1972 births
Living people
Ecuadorian footballers
C.S. Emelec footballers
C.D. Cuenca footballers
Barcelona S.C. footballers
Association football defenders
Ecuador international footballers
C.S. Norte América footballers